Tyurkeyevo (Törkäy) is a rural locality (a village) in Kucherbayevsky Selsoviet, Blagovarsky District, Bashkortostan, Russia. The population was 118 as of 2010. There is 1 street.

Geography 
Tyurkeyevo is located 28 km north of Yazykovo (the district's administrative centre) by road. Akhmetovo is the nearest rural locality.

References 

Rural localities in Blagovarsky District